Synaptophysin-like protein 1 is a protein that in humans is encoded by the SYPL1 gene.

References

Further reading